Blair Moody Jr. (February 27, 1928 – November 26, 1982) was an American jurist.

Born in Detroit, Michigan, Moody's father Blair Moody was a journalist who also served as United States Senator from Michigan. Moody worked as a journalist while in college for The Washington Post and The Detroit News. Moody received his bachelor's degree from University of Michigan and his law degree from University of Michigan Law School in 1952. During the Korean War, Moody served in the United States Air Force. He then practiced law in Detroit, Michigan and was involved with the Democratic Party. Moody was elected as a Michigan Circuit Court judge in 1965 and then served on the Michigan Supreme Court from 1976 until his death in 1982. Moody died in a hospital in Detroit, Michigan, after suffering a heart attack at his home.

See also
 Blair Moody

Notes

1928 births
1982 deaths
Lawyers from Detroit
Military personnel from Detroit
University of Michigan Law School alumni
Journalists from Michigan
Michigan Democrats
Michigan state court judges
Justices of the Michigan Supreme Court
20th-century American non-fiction writers
20th-century American judges
20th-century American lawyers
20th-century American journalists
American male journalists
20th-century American male writers